Isakov is a common Russian and Slavic surname, a derivative from "Isaac".  It may refer to the following people:

 Dimitar Isakov (b. 1924), Bulgarian football player
 Evgeny Isakov (b. 1984), Russian ice hockey player
 Gregory Alan Isakov (b. 1979), South African-American singer-songwriter
 Ismail Isakov (b. 1950), Kyrgyzstan politician and Lieutenant General in the Kyrgyz military
 Ivan Isakov (1894–1967), Soviet Armenian Admiral of the Fleet
 Mile Isakov (b. 1950), Serbian politician and journalist
 Pyotr Isakov (1900–1957), Soviet football player and manager 
 Victor Isakov (b. 1947), American mathematician
 Vladimir Isakov (b. 1970), Russian sport shooter 
 Yuri Andreyevich Isakov (1912–1988), Soviet ornithologist

See also 
 Isaacs
 Isaak

Bulgarian-language surnames
Russian-language surnames
Patronymic surnames
Surnames from given names